Amorbia rhombobasis is a species of moth of the family Tortricidae. It is found in Bolivia, Brazil, Costa Rica and Venezuela, where it is found at altitudes between 600 and 1,760 meters.

The length of the forewings is 9.7–11.2 mm for males and 12.0–14.0 mm for females. The ground colour of the forewings is straw yellow and the hindwings are tan. There are multiple generations per year.

Etymology
The species name refers to the diamond-shaped base of the uncus and is derived from Latin rhombo.

References

Moths described in 2007
Sparganothini
Moths of Central America
Moths of South America